International Kissing Day or World Kiss Day is an official holiday celebrated each year on July 6. The practice originated in the United Kingdom, and was adopted worldwide in the early 2000s.

Another date, February 14, has also been identified as the International Kiss Day, as it is the romantic holiday Valentine's Day.

The concept behind the International Kissing Day is that many people may have forgotten the simple pleasures associated with kissing for kissing's sake, as opposed to kissing as mere social formality or prelude to other activities.

References

July observances
Kissing
Days celebrating love